The Saltire Music Group or Saltire Singers were a Scottish musical group founded by composer Isobel Dunlop (1901–1975) in 1950 for The Saltire Society and directed and conducted by Hans Oppenheim (1892–1965). In addition to performing traditional songs the group also commissioned and performed new works from Scottish composers.

Discography
Burns Night - Songs And Poems Of Robert Burns, with poetry readings by Ian Gilmour and Meta Forrest Angel Records ANG 35256 1956
Also released as An Evening With Robert Burns,  	Columbia Records 1956		
William Byrd Madrigals, Motets, & Anthems, The Saltire Singers Lyrichord	LLST 7156	1966		
Scotland In The Festival - Songs And Poems Of Scotland,  The Saltire Music Group	SIF 01	1970		
John Dowland Music Of Love And Friendship,  Saltire Singers with Desmond Dupré, Musical Heritage Society	MHS 870

References

Scottish musical groups
1950 establishments in Scotland